Zwerling is a surname. Notable people with the surname include:

Darrell Zwerling (1928-2014), American actor
Harriet Sohmers Zwerling (born 1929), American writer and artist's model
Jeff Corey (born Arthur Zwerling; 1914–2002), American stage and screen actor
Lisa Zwerling, American physician, television writer and producer
Yetta Zwerling (died 1982), Yiddish actress

See also
20529 Zwerling main-belt asteroid

German-language surnames
Jewish surnames